André the Giant is a 2018 TV documentary film based on the life of French professional wrestler and actor André René Roussimoff, best known as André the Giant. The documentary covers André's life with gigantism. The film features professional wrestlers and media personalities such as Vince McMahon, Hulk Hogan, Pat Patterson, Tim White, Ric Flair, Dave Meltzer, Arnold Schwarzenegger, Billy Crystal as well as family members discussing André's life.

The film was executively produced by Janine Marmot and Bill Simmons, who had been interested in creating a documentary on André previously. The documentary was slated as focusing on his "upbringing in France, his celebrated career in WWE and his forays in the entertainment world".

Reception
The website's consensus reads, "Well-crafted and entertaining, Andre the Giant is a compelling celebration of a wrestling legend." Metacritic, which uses a weighted average, assigned the film a normalized score of 78 out of 100, based on 6 critics, indicating "generally favorable reviews".

In July 2018, HBO claimed the André the Giant film was the most watched sports documentary in its history.

References

External links

2018 documentary films
2018 films
2018 television films
HBO documentary films
André the Giant
Professional wrestling documentary films
WWE Studios films
2010s American films